Corredor Sur is a Panama Metro station on Line 2. It was opened on 25 April 2019 as part of the inaugural section of Line 2 between San Miguelito and Nuevo Tocumen. This is an elevated station built above Avenida Domingo Díaz, next to the crossing with the Pan-American Highway, locally known as Corredor Sur. The station is located between Don Bosco and Las Mañanitas.

On 16 March 2023, a branch of Line 2, known as El Ramal, connecting Corredor Sur and Aeropuerto was opened. There are no through trains to Aeropuerto, the trains start at Corredor Sur. The adjacent station is ITSE.

References

Panama Metro stations
2019 establishments in Panama
Railway stations opened in 2019